Yadu Bazar (also Romanized as ʿYadū Bāzār) is a village in Negur Rural District, Dashtiari District, Chabahar County, Sistan and Baluchestan Province, Iran. At the 2006 census, its population was 25, in 4 families.

References 

Populated places in Chabahar County